Huwag Mong Buhayin ang Bangkay is a 1987 Philippine horror film written and directed by . The film stars Jestoni Alarcon, Ricky Davao and Charito Solis. It was one of the entries in the 1987 Metro Manila Film Festival.

Cast
Charito Solis as Aurora
Ricky Davao as Gabriel
Robert Ortega as Young Gabriel
Jestoni Alarcon as Robertito
Josemari Gonzales Jr. as Young Robertito
Rita Avila as Julie
Romnick Sarmenta as Boyet
Jennifer Sevilla as Gigi
Pinky Suarez as Helen
Jojo Alejar as Jessie
Ruben Rustia as Lucio
Eddie Infante as Father Augusto
Alma Lerma as Helen's Mother
Ernie David as Dagul
Turko Cervantes as Lucio's Disciple
Luis Benedicto as Helen's Father
Celia Guevarra as Puring
Idda Yaneza as Helen's Friend
Pong Pong as Peter
Nonong de Andres as Lucio's Disciple

Production
Ace Vergel was originally cast in the role of Robertito, but due to scheduling conflicts, he had to drop out of the project, with Jestoni Alarcon taking his role.

Accolades

References

External links

1987 films
1987 horror films
Filipino-language films
Philippine horror films
Seiko Films films
Films directed by Mauro Gia Samonte